Northern Light A.R. Gould Hospital (frequently shortened to ARG), formerly known as The Aroostook Medical Center (TAMC), is a hospital located in Presque Isle, Maine that serves communities throughout Northern Maine. With over 1,000 employees, A.R. Gould is the largest employer in Aroostook County, Northern Light A.R. Gould Hospital is governed by a local volunteer board of trustees.

Northern Light AR Gould Hospital, a leading provider of healthcare services in Northern Maine, is an acute care hospital located in Presque Isle.

The connection with Northern Light Health allows A.R. Gould Hospital to offer a wide range of healthcare services not typically available in rural communities. A.R. Gould has more than 60 physicians on their active medical staff and a team of more than 1,000 employees. A.R. Gould Hospital offers a variety of services including advanced cancer care, cardiology, dialysis, sleep medicine, imaging, emergency response, orthopedic services, primary care, pediatric primary care, OBGYN services, as well as mental and behavioral health services.

References 

 
 

Hospitals in Maine
Companies based in Maine
Hospitals established in 1912
1912 establishments in Maine